William McKinley Sr. (November 15, 1807 – November 24, 1892) was an American manufacturer. He was a pioneer of the iron industry in eastern Ohio as well as the father of President William McKinley.

He was born to James S. McKinley and Mary Rose in Pine Township, Mercer County, Pennsylvania, on November 15, 1807.  The second of thirteen children, he moved to Lisbon, Ohio, in 1809.  Working in the iron business, as had his father, he operated foundries in New Lisbon, Niles, Poland, and finally Canton.  He married Nancy Allison Campbell on January 6, 1829. His parents, James S. and Mary Rose McKinley, both died in South Bend, Indiana, on August 20, 1847.

McKinley Sr. was a Whig and later a Republican party member, and an "ardent advocate" for a protective tariff. McKinley kept a Bible, the works of Dante Alighieri, and Shakespeare with him consistently and used what little time of leisure was allocated from his work to read.

He died in Canton, Ohio, on November 24, 1892, at the age of 85.  He was the father of the 25th president of the United States, William McKinley (born in 1843, when the family lived in Niles), along with 8 other children:

David Allison McKinley (1829–1892)
Anna McKinley (1832–1890)
James Rose McKinley (1833–1889)
Mary McKinley (1835–1868)
Helen Minerva McKinley (1834–1924)
Sarah Elizabeth McKinley (1840–1931)
Abigail Celia McKinley (1845–1846)
Abner Osborn McKinley (1847–1904)

References

External links
http://americanhistory.about.com/od/williammckinley/p/pmckinley.htm
http://www.thienemann-archive.org/getperson.php?personID=I17248&tree=Thienemann
http://www.mckinley.lib.oh.us/mckinley/McKinley%20Family%20Genealogy.doc

1807 births
1892 deaths
American businesspeople
People from Lisbon, Ohio
William Sr.
Fathers of presidents of the United States
Ohio Whigs
Ohio Republicans
William McKinley